The Alberta public colleges and technical institutes have had an informal association since 1990. In 1992, the Council of Presidents and the Council of Board Chairs for the 12 public colleges and institutes became more formalized and an Executive Assistant was hired to provide support to the two councils. Sharon Carry was one of the original founders of the organization.

In August 2002, the Alberta Association of Colleges & Technical Institutes (AACTI) was incorporated under the Societies Act of Alberta. Today, AACTI provides a single voice for Alberta's 16 public colleges and technical institutes. AACTI operates out of two locations; a head office in Edmonton and an innovation office at the Olds College School of Innovation (OCSI). The association is led by Mr. Tim Schultz, AACTI's Executive Director.

Membership
Alberta College of Art and Design
Banff Centre
Bow Valley College
Grande Prairie Regional College
Grant MacEwan College
Keyano College
Lakeland College
Lethbridge College
Medicine Hat College
Northern Alberta Institute of Technology
NorQuest College
Northern Lakes College
Olds College
Portage College
Red Deer College
SAIT Polytechnic

References

External links
Alberta Association of Colleges & Technical Institutes

Educational organizations based in Alberta